Sylvain Graglia (born 12 April 1989) is a French-born Tahitian footballer who plays as a striker for A.S. Pirae and the Tahiti national football team.

Personal
Graglia is from Cannes in France. He moved to Tahiti in 2011 when his wife, who is a nurse, transferred to a French Polynesian hospital.

Career

Youth
As a youth, Graglia played for FC Antibes and trained with AS Cannes.

Club
Between 2012 and 2014, Graglia played for A.S. Dragon of Tahiti Ligue 1. He competed in the 2012–13 OFC Champions League with the club and scored in a victory against Auckland City. Following his tenure with Dragon, he transferred to fellow-Ligue 1 side A.S. Tefana. With Tefana, he competed in 2014–15 Coupe de France and scored in a seventh round 1–2 defeat to Olympique Noisy-le-Sec. He also competed with the club in the 2017 OFC Champions League and scored in a 4–2 victory over Erakor Golden Star F.C. of Vanuatu. He has also played in Tahiti for AS Samine.

He is part of the squad of A.S. Pirae at 2021´s FIFA Club World Cup.

International career
After living in Tahiti for five years beginning in 2011, Graglia became eligible to represent Tahiti. He made his senior international debut on 7 November 2016 in a 2018 FIFA World Cup qualification match against the Solomon Islands. He scored his first two international goals in a 3–1 victory over Papua New Guinea in the same competition on 23 March 2017.

International goals
Score and result list Tahiti's goal tally first.

International statistics

References

External links
 
 OFC profile

1989 births
Living people
French Polynesian footballers
Tahiti international footballers
Association football forwards
Sportspeople from Cannes
French footballers
Footballers from Provence-Alpes-Côte d'Azur